"Who Loves You" is the title song of a 1975 album by The Four Seasons. It was composed by Bob Gaudio and Judy Parker and produced by Gaudio. It reached number 3 on the Billboard Hot 100 in November 1975.

Song information
After their release from Philips, the group signed with Motown and released one album and three singles for the organization in 1972 and 1973. All Motown recordings failed to chart in the U.S. and the company dropped the band. In August 1975, "Who Loves You" entered the Hot 100 as Frankie Valli's "Swearin' to God" was sliding off the chart. This was the final Four Seasons hit featuring bassist and backing vocalist Joe Long.

Reception
Cash Box called it "a high-energy, commercially potent disk with high vocal work and sweet strings — and a rhythm that can make time in any disco." Record World said that "[the group's] trademark sound moves onward!"

Personnel 

 Frankie Valli – lead vocals, backing vocals
 Don Ciccone – electric guitar, co-lead and backing vocals
 Joe Long - bass guitar, backing vocals
 John Paiva – electric guitar, backing vocals
 Gerry Polci – drums, co-lead and backing vocals
 Lee Shapiro – keyboards, piano, string arrangements, synthesizers, backing vocals
 Bob Gaudio – piano, keyboards, producer

Charts

Weekly charts

Year-end charts

(* - Canadian RPM chart data incomplete for late 1975)

Other versions
There were three versions of "Who Loves You" released in the United States: the one on the Who Loves You album is four minutes, 20 seconds long and begins with a short percussion section before the start of the vocals. The A-side of the single has a 4-minute 4 second version which starts with an unusual "fade-in" beginning, starting with the first word of the lyrics; the B-side (labeled "Who Loves You (disco version)") extends the running time to 5:28 by featuring the instrumental break twice.

Although the Four Seasons' trademark falsetto is present on "Who Loves You", Valli's vocal performance on the recording is limited to singing lead on the verses.

"Who Loves You" was a tremendous success, a notable feat from a group which had not had a major hit for many years. Released in August 1975, the single spent 20 weeks on the Hot 100 (longer than any Four Seasons single before) and managed to stay on the chart until the beginning of 1976.

This song was edited heavily and included as the closing number for the musical Jersey Boys. The second verse and instrumental break is completely omitted, and instead of the fade out, a loud, high-pitched ending chord is sung by the full company. However, the Original Broadway Cast Recording includes the instrumental break.

Pop-culture references
The song was often used as bumper music by late night radio talk show host Art Bell when he hosted Coast to Coast AM in the 1990s.

Christopher Knowles references the song-title and Valli/Four Seasons in a section of the libretto of Einstein on the Beach.

References

1975 singles
The Four Seasons (band) songs
Songs written by Bob Gaudio
Song recordings produced by Bob Gaudio
1975 songs
Curb Records singles
Warner Records singles